The John C. Allen House, on Kentucky Route 61 in Green County, Kentucky, about  south of Summersville, Kentucky, was built in 1803.  It was listed on the National Register of Historic Places in 1985.

It is notable for its Federal architecture and its display of pre-Federal features.  It is a two-story, five-bay brick house, with brick laid in Flemish bond.

References

National Register of Historic Places in Green County, Kentucky
Federal architecture in Kentucky
Houses completed in 1803
1803 establishments in Kentucky
Houses on the National Register of Historic Places in Kentucky
Houses in Green County, Kentucky